The Zhejiang-Jiangxi campaign was a military campaign fought from May to September 1942 as part of the Second Sino-Japanese War. This article in as order of battle, listing the present Chinese and Japanese military forces.

Japan 

China Expeditionary Force – General Shunroku Hata (畑俊六) (Late April, 1942)
 13th Army – Lt. General Shigeru Sawada (沢田茂)
 15th Division – Lt. General Naotsugu Sakai (酒井直次) – KIA
 15th Infantry Group HQ
 51st Infantry Regiment
 60th Infantry Regiment
 67th Infantry Regiment
 21st Field Artillery Regiment
 15th Engineer Regiment
 15th Division Signal Unit
 15th Transport Regiment
 22nd Division – Lt. General Sanji Ōkido (大城戸三治)
 84th Infantry regiment
 85th Infantry regiment
 86th Infantry regiment
 52nd Mountain Artillery Regiment
 22nd Military Engineer Regiment
 22nd Transport Regiment
 32nd Division – Lt. General Tetsuzo Ide (井出鉄蔵 [3]) [2]
 32nd Infantry Group HQ
 210th Infantry Regiment
 211th Infantry Regiment
 212th Infantry Regiment
 32nd Armored Vehicle Squadron
 32nd Field Artillery Regiment
 32nd Engineer Regiment
 32nd Transport Regiment

 70th Division – Lt. General Takayuki Uchida (内田孝行)
 61st Infantry Brigade
 102nd Independent Infantry Battalion
 103rd Independent Infantry Battalion
 104th Independent Infantry Battalion
 105th Independent Infantry Battalion
 62nd Infantry Brigade
 121st Independent Infantry Battalion
 122nd Independent Infantry Battalion
 123rd Independent Infantry Battalion
 124th Independent Infantry Battalion
 Labor troops
 116th Division – Lt. General Toshijiro Takeuchi (武内俊二郎)
 119th Infantry Brigade
 109th Infantry Regiment
 120th Infantry Regiment
 130th Infantry Brigade
 133rd Infantry Regiment
 138th Infantry Regiment
 120th Cavalry Battalion
 122nd Field Artillery Regiment
 116th Military Engineer Regiment
 116th Transport Regiment
 12th Independent Mixed Brigade – Major General Johkichi Nanbu – (南部襄吉) [2]
 51st Independent Infantry Battalion
 52nd Independent Infantry Battalion
 53rd Independent Infantry Battalion
 54th Independent Infantry Battalion
 55th Independent Infantry Battalion
 artillery troops
 labor troops
 signal communication unit.
 13th Independent Mixed Brigade – Major General Haruo Yamamura (山村治雄) [2]
 56th Independent Infantry Battalion
 57th Independent Infantry Battalion
 58th Independent Infantry Battalion
 59th Independent Infantry Battalion
 60th Independent Infantry Battalion
 artillery troops
 labor troops
 signal communication unit.
 17th Independent Mixed Brigade – Major General Hachiro Tagami (田上八郎) [2]
 87th Independent Infantry Battalion
 88th Independent Infantry Battalion
 89th Independent Infantry Battalion
 90th Independent Infantry Battalion
 91st Independent Infantry Battalion
 artillery troops
 labor troops
 signal communication unit.
 Directly under 13th Army
 3 Separate Artillery Regiments
 3 Separate Engineer Regiments
 1 Tank Battalion ?
 5 truck Regiments
 1 Road Construction Battalion

 11th Army – Lt. General Korechika Anami (阿南惟幾)
 3rd Division  – Lt. General Tagaji Takahashi (高橋多賀二)
 5th Infantry Brigade
 6th Infantry Regiment
 68th Infantry Regiment
 29th Infantry Brigade
 18th Infantry Regiment *
 34th Infantry Regiment
 3rd Field Artillery Regiment
 3rd Cavalry Regiment
 3rd Engineer Regiment
 3rd Transport Regiment
 34th Division – Lt. General Shigeru Ōga (大賀茂)
 ?
 Takehara Column – Major General Saburo Takehara (竹原三郎)
 4 Battalions from 6th Division
 Imai Column – Colonel Takejiro Imai (今井亀次郎)
 3 inf Battalions/40th Div.
 Ide Column – Colonel Tokutaro Ide (井出篤太郎)
 1 Infantry Battalion /68th Div.
 Hirano Column – Colonel Giichi Hirano (平野儀一)
 1 Infantry Battalion /68th Div.

Airforce:
 1st Air Group (第一飛行団)
 2 Recon flights
 1 Recon squadron
 1 Fighter squadron
 1 squadron Lt bombers
 1 squadron Hvy bombers

Notes:
 [1] 3rd Division was reorganized as a triangular Division in July. The 18th Infantry Regiment was removed and the remaining Infantry Regiments were subordinated under the 3rd Infantry Brigade Group.
 [2] 2nd, 6th and 9th Independent Tankette Companies participated in the campaign. But, 2nd and 6th were used in the sub-operation along Dongting Lake and 9th stayed at Nanchang for a feint operation.
 [3] 34th Recon Regiment participated in the main operation, but its tankette company was left behind and did not see action.

China 

3rd War Area - Ku Chu-tung
 25th Army Group - Li Chueh
 88th Corps - Ho Shou-chou
 New 21st Division
 New 30th Division
 32nd Provincial Division
 9th Provincial Corps - Feng Sheng-fu
 33rd Provincial Division
 34th Provincial Division
 35th Provincial Division
 10th Army Group - Wang Ching-chiu
 49th Corps - Wang Tieh-han
 26th Division
 105th Division
 13th Provincial Division
 79th Division
 53rd Division
 32nd Army Group - ?
 25th Corps - Chang Wen-ching
  40th Division
  55th Division
 108th Division
 28th Corps - Tao Kuang
 62nd Division
 192nd Division
 23rd Army Group - Tang Shih-tsun
 21st Corps - Liu Yu-ching
 146th Division
 147th Division
 148th Division
 50th Corps - Fan Tse-ying
 144th Division
 145th Division
 New 7th Division
 26th Corps - Ting Chih-pan
 32nd Division
 41st Division
 46th Division
 86th Corps - Mo Yu-shuo
 16th Division
 (less 79th Division)
 67th Division
 74th Corps - Wang Yao-wu
 51st Division
 57th Division
 58th Division
 100th Corps - Shih Chung-cheng
 19th Division
 (less 63rd Division)
 75th Division
 5th Reserve Division

9th War Area - ?
  4th Corps
 59th Division
 90th Division
 100th Division
 58th Corps
 New 10th Division
 New 11th Division
 79th Corps
 98th Division
 194th Division
 6th Provincial Division

Airforce:
 ?

References

Sources 
 Hsu Long-hsuen and Chang Ming-kai, History of The Sino-Japanese War (1937–1945) 2nd Ed., 1971. Translated by Wen Ha-hsiung, Chung Wu Publishing; 33, 140th Lane, Tung-hwa Street, Taipei, Taiwan Republic of China.
  Generals of World War II
 1億人の昭和史 『日本の戦史6 (日中戦争4)』 毎日新聞社, Mainichi Shimbunsha, 1979.
  第３２師団長 

Zhejiang-Jiangxi
Zhejiang-Jiangxi